Theft by Finding: Diaries (1977–2002) is an edited compilation of diary entries by David Sedaris published on May 30, 2017. Sedaris shares selected entries spanning from his days as a 20-year-old hitchhiking through Oregon to living in London just shy of his 46th birthday. It was released in advance of David Sedaris Diaries: A Visual Compendium, which was published the same year and edited by Jeffrey Jenkins.

References 

Works by David Sedaris
Diaries
Little, Brown and Company books
2017 non-fiction books